Kemzeke is a village in the Belgian municipality of Stekene in the province of East-Flanders. Until 1977, it was an independent municipality. It is located between the Dutch border and Sint-Niklaas.

Overview
In 1117, the parish of Kemzeke became independent from Waasmunster. Around 1630, the Sint-Jan fortress was built near Kemzeke as part of the defensive lineage between the Dutch Republic and the Spanish Netherlands. The fortress was never conquered, but was left to deteriorate, and was later dissected by a road during the Austrian period. In 1977, the municipality merged into Stekene except for the hamlet of 't Hol which became part of Sint-Gillis-Waas.

Eddy Merckx rode his last cycling race in Kemzeke, in which he finished 12th.

Verbeke Foundation

The Verbeke Foundation is a privately owned museum of modern and contemporary art. It is owned by Geert Verbeke, an art collector. It contains a 12 hectares nature area and 20,000 square metres of buildings making it one of the largest private contemporary art in Europe, and is home to residential artists.

Nature
The nature reserve De Gavers consists of wetlands. The area around the Gavermeer is an important bird refuge. The reserve includes a seven hectares arboretum which contains more than 170 species of trees.

References

External links
 
 Village site (in Dutch)

Stekene
Populated places in East Flanders
Former municipalities of East Flanders